Tom Curtis may refer to:

 Tom Curtis (American football) (born 1947), American football player
 Tom Curtis (footballer) (born 1973), English soccer player

See also
 Tommy Curtis (1952–2021), American college basketball player
 Thomas Curtis (disambiguation)